Gold-Fun  (大運財, formerly known as Strada Colorato 17 January 2009 – 7 August 2016) was an Irish-bred Thoroughbred racehorse trained in Hong Kong since 2012. He is notable for winning the Hong Kong Classic Mile 2013, National Day Cup 2013 (HKG3–1400m), the HKG2 Oriental Watch Sha Tin Trophy, the HKG1 Queen's Silver Jubilee Cup 2014 and the Celebration Cup 2014.

Background
Born on 17 January 2009 in Ireland, Gold-Fun was sired by Le Vie Dei Colori, a fourteen-time winner including the champion of Premio Vittorio Di Capua (GI) of Italy.

Racing career
During his time in Ireland, Gold-Fun won a race and thereafter finished 2nd in another.

Gold-Fun acquired his first Class 3 1600m champion in his second race in Hong Kong in December 2012, thanks to his quick adaptation to environment. His consistent improvement led him to the championship of a Class 2 1600m race on the first day of 2013 and to the championship of the Hong Kong Classic Mile 2013 nineteen days later. He is also the 2nd runner-up of BMW Hong Kong Derby 2013, losing only by a neck to the champion Akeed Mofeed.

On 1 October 2013, he was crowned champion of the National Day Cup 2013. Not long after the victory on 1 October, he won the trophy of the HKG2 Oriental Watch Sha Tin Trophy at Sha Tin racecourse on 27 October 2013. Gold-Fun continued his victory by winning the G2 BOCHK Wealth Management Jockey Club Mile on 17 November. Gold-Fun was the 1st runner-up of the G1 LONGINES Hong Kong Mile on 8 December 2013, losing by three-quarters of a length to the champion Glorious Days. Gold-Fun stamped his class on the HKG1 Queen's Silver Jubilee Cup (1400m) at Sha Tin racecourse on 16 March 2014, with a commanding half-length victory over the consistently gallant Dan Excel.

Gold-Fun had defied a 130lbs burden and a troubled stretch run to land the spoils in the 1400m contest from a star-studded field of rivals, and claimed the trophy of the Celebration Cup held on 5 October 2014. On 15 February 2015, Gold-Fun gained his first victory at a distance short of 1400m at HKG1 1200M The Chairman's Sprint Prize, winning a short-head from Aerovelocity. Gold-Fun continued his victory by winning the G2 BOCHK Wealth Management Jockey Club Sprint from Not Listenin’tome and Peniaphobia. On 18 June 2016, Gold-Fun ran second in the 1200m G1 Diamond Jubilee Stakes at Royal Ascot, losing narrowly by a neck to the champion Twilight Son. In the Prix Maurice de Gheest at Deauville Racecourse on 7 August he was in third place when he fell 75 metres from the finish and sustained fatal injuries.

Racing record

References

External links
Hong Kong Jockey Club

2009 racehorse births
2016 racehorse deaths
Horses who died from racing injuries
Racehorses bred in Ireland
Racehorses trained in Hong Kong
Thoroughbred family 1-p